Darlington Nuclear Generating Station is a Canadian nuclear power station located on the north shore of Lake Ontario in Clarington, Ontario. It is a large nuclear facility comprising four CANDU nuclear reactors with a total output of 3,512 MWe (capacity net) when all units are online.  It is Canada's second-largest nuclear power plant and provides about 20 percent of Ontario's electricity needs, enough to serve a city of two million people. It is named for the Township of Darlington (now part of Clarington), the name of the municipality in which it is located at the time of its planning.

Construction and operation
The facility was constructed in stages between 1981 and 1993 by the provincial Crown corporation, Ontario Hydro.  Unit 2 was brought online in 1990, Unit 1 in 1992, and Units 3 and 4 in 1993. In April 1999 Ontario Hydro was split into 5 component Crown corporations with Ontario Power Generation (OPG) taking over all electrical generating stations. The Darlington reactors have been among the best performing in OPG's CANDU fleet, including a top year in 2008 in which the plant achieved a combined 94.5% capacity factor. In June 2016, the World Association of Nuclear Operators (WANO) named Darlington one of the safest and top performing nuclear stations in the world - for the third time in a row.

After public hearings, the Canadian Nuclear Safety Commission announced in December 2015 the renewal of Darlington’s power reactor operating licence, for a 10 year period from Jan. 1, 2016 until Nov. 30, 2025, to allow for the refurbishment of the Darlington station, which began in October 2016.

In March 2017, Ontario Power Generation (OPG) and its venture arm, Canadian Nuclear Partners, announced plans to produce Plutonium-238 as a second source for NASA. Rods containing Np-237 will be fabricated by Pacific Northwest National Laboratory (PNNL) in Washington State and shipped to OPG's Darlington Nuclear Generating Station where they will be irradiated with neutrons inside the reactor's core to produce Pu-238.

Electrical Output
The graph represents the annual electricity generation at the site in TWh.

As of the end of 2021, the total lifetime output of the facility was 929.24 TWh.

Cost overruns
The Darlington station incurred massive cost overruns during its construction.
The initial cost estimate for the station was $3.9 billion CAD in the late 1970s, which increased to $7.4 billion in 1981 when construction was started. A year-long period of public hearings and study by an Ontario government all-party committee finished in 1986 with the decision to proceed with the project, which had then risen to $7 billion in actual and committed costs. The final cost was $14.4 billion CAD, almost double the initial construction budget. The project was adversely affected by declining electricity demand forecasts, mounting debt of Ontario Hydro, and the Chernobyl disaster which necessitated safety reviews in mid-construction. Each delay incurred interest charges on debt, which ultimately accounted for 70% of the cost overruns. Inflation during 1977 to 1981 was 46 percent, according to Canada's Consumer Price index. In addition interest rates were running at 20 percent. Improper choice of equipment and a six-month labour stoppage of electrical workers also yielded some of these costs and delays. Discussion of who is to blame for the costs and subsequent debts associated with Darlington often arise during provincial election campaigns, and are often mentioned in anti-nuclear literature.

Refurbishment project 
On October 14, 2016, OPG began Canada’s largest clean infrastructure project – the refurbishment of all four of Darlington’s reactors. According to the Conference Board of Canada, the $12.8 billion investment will generate $14.9 billion in economic benefits to Ontario, including thousands of construction jobs at Darlington and at some 60 Ontario companies supplying components for the work. The project is scheduled for completion by 2026, and will ensure safe plant operation through 2055.

The first reactor to be refurbished was Unit 2. In March 2020, it was announced that the refurbishment of Unit 2 was complete, and in April 2020, the reactor achieved criticality for the first time since being reassembled. The reactor was reconnected to the grid in June.

New build proposal
In 2006, OPG started the federal approvals process to build new nuclear units at the site of its Darlington Nuclear Station. The project proposal involved the construction and operation of up to four nuclear units, with capacity of up to 4,800 MW.

A request for proposals (RFP) process for design and construction resulted in bids from Areva NP, Westinghouse, and Atomic Energy of Canada Limited (AECL). In June 2009, the Government of Ontario put the RFP process on hold, citing unexpectedly high bids, and the uncertainty surrounding the future of the only compliant bidder (AECL).

In August 2011, the three-member Joint Review Panel (mandated by the Ontario Ministry of the Environment and the Canadian Nuclear Safety Commission) released a report finding that the Darlington new build project would not result in any significant adverse environmental impacts (after taking into account mitigation measures). Following the report, the federal government approved the Environmental Assessment.

In October 2013, the Ontario government declared that the Darlington new build project would not be a part of Ontario's long term energy plan, citing the high capital cost estimates and energy surplus in the province at the time of the announcement.

In November 2020, Ontario Power Generation (OPG) announced plans to build a small modular reactor (SMR) at Darlington Nuclear Generating Station. It is expected to be operational by 2028 at the earliest. OPG will work with GE Hitachi Nuclear Canada to build the SMR.

On December 2nd, 2022, Ontario Power Generation officially broke ground on the new build Darlington SMR (Darlington B) project. The first unit to be constructed is a GE BWRX-300 unit, expected to be operational by 2028.

Waste
Low and intermediate level waste from Darlington is stored at the Western Waste Management Facility (WWMF) at the Bruce nuclear site near Kincardine, Ontario.  OPG has proposed the construction and operation of a deep geologic repository for the long-term storage of this low and intermediate level waste on lands adjacent to WWMF.

On May 6, 2015 the Joint Review Panel issued the Environmental Assessment (EA) Report recommending the approval of the Deep Geologic Repository for Ontario’s low and intermediate level waste to the federal government.

In February 2016, the Federal Minister of Environment and Climate Change delayed a decision on OPG’s DGR, causing a pause in the timeline for the environmental assessment decision to be issued. OPG has since committed to completing further DGR studies by the end of 2016.

The Darlington Waste Management Facility provides dry storage for the used fuel from Darlington, after an initial period in a water-filled storage bay. The facility was opened in 2007, reportedly on schedule and on budget.  The Nuclear Waste Management Organization is seeking a site in Canada for a permanent repository for used fuel from all of Canada's nuclear reactors.

Records

2020: On Tuesday, September 15 Darlington Unit 1 broke the world record for continuous generation at 963 days, a record previous held by Pickering Unit 7 at 894 days for 22 years until it was broken in 2016 by Heysham 2 in the UK. As of September 28, 2020, Unit 1 was at 976 days.
2021: On Thursday, February 4 at sometime after 11PM Darlington Unit 1 finally went down for maintenance after 1,106 continuous days of generation, setting the world nuclear operation record and world thermal plant generation record.

Spill
In 2009, more than 200,000 litres of water containing trace amounts of tritium and hydrazine spilled into Lake Ontario after workers accidentally filled the wrong tank with tritiated water. However the level of the isotope in the lake was less than 1 percent of the regulatory limit and consistent with normal operational activities.

See also

 List of largest power stations in Canada
 List of nuclear reactors in Canada
 Nuclear power in Canada
 Pickering Nuclear Generating Station
 Bruce Nuclear Generating Station
 Point Lepreau Nuclear Generating Station

References

External links

 Ontario Power Generation Web site
 Darlington New Build Web Site

Nuclear power stations with proposed reactors
Nuclear power stations in Ontario
Nuclear power stations using CANDU reactors
Ontario Power Generation
Buildings and structures in Clarington
Energy infrastructure completed in 1990